Gurjant Singh (born 26 January 1995) is an Indian field hockey player who plays as a Forward.

He was part of the Indian squad which won gold at 2016 Men's Hockey Junior World Cup in Lucknow, India.

References

External links
Gurjant Singh at Hockey India

1995 births
Living people
Indian male field hockey players
Field hockey players from Punjab, India
Olympic field hockey players of India
Field hockey players at the 2020 Summer Olympics
Male field hockey forwards
Hockey India League players
Olympic bronze medalists for India
Medalists at the 2020 Summer Olympics
Olympic medalists in field hockey
Field hockey players at the 2022 Commonwealth Games
Commonwealth Games silver medallists for India
Commonwealth Games medallists in field hockey
Recipients of the Arjuna Award
Medallists at the 2022 Commonwealth Games